Ravi Baswani (29 September 1946 – 27 July 2010) was an Indian film actor, best known for his role in Sai Paranjpe's Chashme Buddoor (1981) and Kundan Shah's cult comedy Jaane Bhi Do Yaaro (1983), for which he won Filmfare Best Comedian Award in 1984. He was noted for his comic timing and underplaying a character in the true sense of the word. In a career spanning 30 years he acted in some 30 films. He died in Haldwani, on his way to Delhi from Nainital, to where he had travelled to scout for locations for his upcoming debut directorial feature film.

Early life and education
Ravi Baswani was born and brought up in a Jat family in Delhi. He did his schooling from St. George's College, Mussoorie and his graduation from Kirori Mal College (KMC), Delhi University, where he was part of the KMC dramatic society.

Career
Baswani started his career in 1981 with Chashme Buddoor and did many successful films as a comedian and/or as a character artist. He also appeared many times on Indian television. He went on to work in films like the cult Jaane Bhi Do Yaaro, Kabhi Haan Kabhi Naa, Chhota Chetan, Ab Aayega Maza and Naseeruddin Shah's first directorial venture, Yun Hota Toh Kya Hota. As a television actor, he acted in numerous TV serials, including, the popular comedy serial, Idhar Udhar on Doordarshan in the 1980s, wherein he acted alongside Pathak sisters, Supriya Pathak and Ratna Pathak. He was then seen in character roles in films like Bunty Aur Babli and Pyar Tune Kya Kiya. In 2004, when Film and Television Institute of India, Pune revived its acting course after 26 years, he became its coordinator and a teacher, along with Naseeruddin Shah, who also redesigned the course. Baswani however resigned the following year.

Death
Baswani died following a massive heart attack on 27 July 2010 in Haldwani (Distt. Nainital). He was returning from Nainital to Delhi, where he had to hunt for locations for his directorial debut film, set in the hills. He never married.

Filmography

Television
Idhar Udhar (1985) as Kumar Bhairav
Ek Se Badkar Ek (1996) as Rahul
Football Ki Wapsi
Just Mohabbat (1997) as J.D.

References

External links
 
 Ravi Baswani's last interview The Times of India

Indian male comedians
Male actors from New Delhi
Filmfare Awards winners
1946 births
2010 deaths
Male actors in Hindi cinema
Indian male television actors
Kirori Mal College alumni
People from Delhi
20th-century Indian male actors